Chahar Barud (also Romanized as Chahār Barūd; also known as Charūrī) is a village in Kuhestan Rural District, Qaleh Chay District, Ajab Shir County, East Azerbaijan Province, Iran. At the 2006 census, its population was 743, in 165 families.

References 

Populated places in Ajab Shir County